Tercera Division de Fútbol Salvadoreño is the third division of football in El Salvador.
The champion is promoted to the Segunda División de El Salvador. The team with the lowest points in each group will be demoted to the amateur league.

Structure
There are 24 clubs in Tercera Division divided into 4 groups of 10. They play in Apertura and Clausura. The clubs plays every team in each group twice. The top four teams from each group, 16 teams in total, qualify for play-offs to determine the winner of the apertura and clausura title. The winners will be promoted to the Segunda División de El Salvador.

Similarly, the Three clubs that finished at the bottom of Tercera Division are relegated to ADFA and are replaced by the top three clubs.

Current directors of the third Division Salvadoran professional football season 2015/2016

Management

The President of the bronze league Salvadoran soccer season 2015/2016

Past champions in Tercera Division de Fútbol Salvadoreño

 70-71 : CD Titán 
 71-72 : CD Dragón 
 72-73 : CD El Roble 
 73-74 : A.D.O. 
 74-75 : ADTE 
 75-76 : CD Chaguite 
 76-77 : A.F.I.
 77-78 : ADTE 
 78-79 : A.F.I.
 79-80 : ADET 
 1980-81  : A.F.I.
 1981-82  : CD Los Andes 
 1982-83  : CD Platense 
 1983-84  : ADTE 
 1984-85  : CD Tehuacan 
 1985-86  : ADET 
 1986-87  : AD Municipal 
 1987-88  : CD TACA 
 1988-89  : CD L.A. Firpo 
 1989-90  : Atlético Marte 
 1990-91  : Jocoro FC 
 1991-92  : Malacoff 
 1992-93  : ADTE 
 1993-94  : CD El Roble 
 1994-95  : A.F.I.
 1995-96  : A.D.O. 
 1996-97  : Atlético Morazan 
 1997-98  : A.F.I. 
 1998-99  : CD Tehuacan 
 1999-00  : CD Huracán 
 2000-01  : CD El Roble 
 2001-02  : CD Luis Ángel Firpo 
 2002-03  : A.D.O. 
 2003-04  : ADTE 
 2004-05  : Halcones Municipal 
 2005-06  : CD Los Andes 
 2006-07  : CD Maracaná 
 2007-08  : ADET 
 2008-09  : C.D. UES 
 2009-10  : AD Isidro Metapan C
 2010-2011: C.D. Titán 
 2011-2012: AD Isidro Metapán C, C.D. La Asunción
 2012-2013: CD Espíritu Santo, Turín FESA FC, CSD Ciclon de Golfo
 2013-2014: Atlético Comalapa, C.D. Audaz

 2014-2015: Fuerte San Francisco
 2015-2016: Turín FESA F.C., Jocoro F.C., Rácing Jr
 2016-2017: UDET, C.D. Chaguite, CD Ilopaneco
 2017-2018: Turín FESA F.C., CD Santa Rosa Guachipilín (promotion), C.D. Liberal (Promotion), Ciclon Del Golfo 
2018-19: Turín FESA F.C., Cacahuatique , Gerardo Barrios (promoted)
2019-20: No Clausura champion or Promotion
2020-21: Inter San Salvador, Corinto FC 
2021-22: Fuerte Aguilares (Apertura 2021)/AD Masahuat (Clausura 2022)  Audaz (Apertura 2022)/Club Deportivo Pipil (Clausura 2022)
2022-23: Los Laureles (Apertura 2022)/ (Clausura 2023); C.D. Santiagueno (Apertura 2022)/ (Clausura 2023)

2022-23 teams

Zona Centro Occidente

Group A

Group B

Zona Centro Oriente

Group A

Group B

Clubs who have competed in the Tecera Division, but not currently

References

External links
  - Official website 
 2012 Clausura final tables - El Gráfico 

3
El